Nine Lives is Steve Winwood's ninth solo studio album, released on 29 April 2008. It is his last to date.

The album's first single, "Dirty City" featuring guitarist Eric Clapton, held the number-one added single spot for three weeks in a row and peaked at the overall number-two spot on AAA Radio.

The album debuted at number 12 on the U.S. Billboard 200 chart, selling about 26,000 copies in its first week.

Track listing
 "I'm Not Drowning" (Steve Winwood, Peter Godwin) – 3:32
 "Fly" (Winwood, Godwin, José Pires de Almeida Neto) – 7:49
 "Raging Sea" (Winwood, Godwin, Neto) – 6:17
 "Dirty City" (with Eric Clapton) (Winwood, Godwin) – 7:44
 "We're All Looking" (Winwood, Godwin) – 5:25
 "Hungry Man" (Winwood, Godwin, Neto) – 7:07
 "Secrets" (Winwood, Godwin, Neto) – 6:41
 "At Times We Do Forget" (Winwood, Godwin, Neto) – 5:57
 "Other Shore" (Winwood, Godwin, Neto) – 6:41

Personnel 
 Steve Winwood – vocals, Hammond organ, guitars
 Tim Cansfield – guitars
 Eric Clapton – guitars, guitar solo (4)
 José Pires de Almeida Neto – guitars
 Richard Bailey – drums
 Karl Vanden Bossche – percussion
 Paul Booth – flute, saxophone, human whistle

Production 
 Steve Winwood – producer
 Johnson Somerset – associate producer
 James Towler – engineer, mixing
 Tony Cousins – mastering
 Josh Cheuse – art direction, design
 Sam Erickson – photography
 Juan Pont Lezica – photography

Studios
 Recorded and Mixed at Wincraft Studios (Gloucestershire, UK).
 Mastered at Metropolis Studios (London, UK).

References

Steve Winwood albums
2008 albums
Columbia Records albums
Albums produced by Steve Winwood